Chalais is a commune in the Indre department in central France.

Geography
The commune is located in the parc naturel régional de la Brenne.

The river Anglin flows northwest through the southwestern part of the commune.

Population

See also
Communes of the Indre department

References

Communes of Indre